Bicyclus pareensis is a butterfly in the family Nymphalidae. It is found in Tanzania.

References

Elymniini
Butterflies described in 2008
Endemic fauna of Tanzania
Butterflies of Africa